Ololygon peixotoi is a species of frog in the family Hylidae. It is endemic to Brazil.

References

peixotoi
Endemic fauna of Brazil
Amphibians described in 2007